Iduvai is a village near Tiruppur in the south Indian state of Tamil Nadu. It is located on Tirupur–Palladam State Highway 19.

Demographics
The total population of this village is about 4,000–5,000. There are about 900–1000 families. The male to female ratio is 51:49. The literacy rate is 68.2%.

Employment
The main occupation is weaving and farming. The majority of the people earn a living by going to Tiruppur to work. The main occupation weaving is on the decline in the village. As of November 2012, there are only a handful of weavers weaving in the traditional way. The growth of power looms has still kept the weaving tradition alive in the village. nowadays few garment factories and sizing mills are started

Schools
Iduvai has 6 government schools and 2 matriculation schools.
Wisdom Matriculation Hr sec school
Govt High School, Iduvai
Govt Elementary School, Iduvai
Govt Elementary School, Attayampalayam
Govt Elementary School, Chinnakalipalayam
Govt Elementary School, Seeranampalayam
Govt Elementary School, Bharathipuram
Kamachiamman Matriculation school

Connectivity

The nearest railway station is Tirupur which is 9  km away. The nearest airport is Coimbatore (CJB). 
Bus transport from Tirupur is serviced via Route numbers 2, 2B, 5D, 33 and P4.

Villages in Tiruppur district